Çayırlı is a village located in the Midyat District of the Mardin Province in Turkey. It is part of the municipality Midyat. The village is populated by Kurds of the Botikan tribe and had a population of 254 as of 2021.

The village is Yazidi.

The settlement of Derebaşı is a hamlet of Çayırlı and is also populated by Kurds of the Botikan tribe who adhere to Yazidism.

History 
In March 1879, British officer Trotter visited the village and described the village as "a large village abandoned and in ruins, evidently quite recently deserted". The village was seemingly plundered and burned by the Ottomans and the villagers had fled to the mountains with their chief while others settled in Meziza.

In 2014, a Bundestag report stated that refugees from the village had difficulties returning to the village by paramilitary and Islamic-fundamentalistic groups.

Location 
Kefnas is located ca.  east of the Yazidi village Koçan and ca.  northeast of the Yazidi village Denwan.

Population

References

Further reading 

Villages in Midyat District
Tur Abdin
Yazidi villages in Turkey
Kurdish settlements in Mardin Province